Franklin is a lunar impact crater that is located in the northeast part of the visible Moon; it is named after Benjamin Franklin. To the north-northwest is the smaller crater Cepheus, and in the opposite direction to the southwest is the shallow Berzelius.

The rim of Franklin is generally circular, with a pair of outward bulges in the western wall. The inner wall is terraced, and there is a central peak at the midpoint of the floor. A narrow cleft runs to the west-southwest across the floor, passing to the north of the central peak.

Satellite craters
By convention these features are identified on lunar maps by placing the letter on the side of the crater midpoint that is closest to Franklin.

References

 
 
 
 
 
 
 
 
 
 
 
 

Impact craters on the Moon